The Southern Africa Non-aggression Pact required signatory states to ensure that no individual or organization attacked a signatory state from signatory soil. Presidents Jose Eduardo dos Santos of Angola, Mobutu Sese Seko of Zaire, and Kenneth Kaunda of Zambia signed the agreement on October 14, 1979. The signatories also signed a treaty on transportation and communication cooperation the same day.

The treaty came in direct response to Cuba's invasions of Zaire from Angola in 1977 and in 1978.

See also
Alvor Agreement
Bicesse Accords
Brazzaville Protocol
Lusaka Protocol
Nakuru Agreement

References

1979 in Angola
1979 in Zaire
1979 in Zambia
Treaties of the People's Republic of Angola
Treaties of Zaire
Treaties of Zambia
Treaties concluded in 1979
Non-aggression pacts